"The Gas Man" is the season finale of the third season of the American police drama television series Homicide: Life on the Street. It originally aired on NBC on May 5, 1995. The episode was written by Henry Bromell and directed by Barry Levinson. The episode focuses on characters played by guest stars Bruno Kirby and Richard Edson, with the detectives who normally serve as the protagonists here serving the function as secondary characters.

Plot summary  
The story focuses on Victor Helms, whose life has fallen apart while he was in prison, serving a six-year sentence for negligent homicide. Victor had incorrectly installed a gas heater in a home, resulting in a leak that killed the entire family living there. Frank Pembleton was the primary investigator and key prosecution witness for the case against Victor, so when Victor is released from prison, he immediately seeks revenge.

Victor stalks Pembleton — spying on him with binoculars, breaking into his house to turn the stove on, and even engaging in polite conversation with Pembleton's wife Mary in a grocery store — yet remains unsure of how to go about getting revenge. Frank and Mary, meanwhile, remain oblivious that Victor has been stalking them.  At first, Victor thinks he's found an angle for revenge when he discovers Pembleton's secret — that Frank has been going to a fertility clinic in an attempt to get Mary pregnant — but he changes his mind when, in the process of stalking Pembleton, Victor and his friend Danny stumble upon a crime scene shortly before Pembleton arrives.  Danny and Victor are initially horrified to discover that a fortune teller's head has been severed, but Victor steals the head and the murder weapon (a large knife) to complicate Pembleton's investigation.  Victor explains to Danny that his plan is to repeatedly tamper with the evidence at the crime scene, in hopes that the investigation will eventually become hopelessly confused, and a public humiliation for Pembleton.  His plan starts to work, but Danny—who has come to respect Pembleton after observing the way he lives his life—walks away from Victor's plan, pointing out that unlike Victor the detective takes responsibility for his own life and actions. Losing patience, Victor lures Pembleton into an abandoned building by calling in an anonymous tip on where Frank can retrieve the knife and the head.  Victor takes Frank by surprise, putting the knife to his throat, but cannot bring himself to kill the detective. He breaks down in tears and is taken into custody.

Production 
According to the DVD commentary by director/producer Barry Levinson, NBC was on the fence about whether to renew Homicide for a fourth season; the show was earning critical acclaim, but struggling in the ratings.  Levinson claims that the network led him to believe that the show would be cancelled, and yet failed to give him a definitive answer.  Levinson's decision to give the show's acclaimed regular characters minimal screen time was an act of defiance aimed at the network.

Cultural references 
Danny listens to a constant stream of disco songs from the 1970s; the list of songs is provided on the DVD release of the episode.

References 

1.  Kalat, David P. (1998). Homicide: Life on the Street: The Unofficial Companion. Los Angeles, California: Renaissance Books. p. 102. .

2.  Levinson, Barry. (2003) (Audio commentary). Homicide Life on the Street - The Seasons 1 & 2. [DVD]. A&E Home Video.

Homicide: Life on the Street (season 3) episodes
1995 American television episodes